Martrell Spaight (born August 5, 1993) is an American football linebacker for the Vegas Vipers of the XFL. He was drafted by the Washington Redskins in the fifth round of the 2015 NFL Draft. He played college football at the University of Arkansas. He also played for the Miami Dolphins, Jacksonville Jaguars and Kansas City Chiefs.

College statistics

Professional career

Washington Redskins
The Washington Redskins selected Spaight with the 141st overall pick in the 2015 NFL Draft. Despite playing outside linebacker in college, he switched to the inside linebacker position in the Redskins' defensive scheme. He signed a four-year contract on May 11, 2015. On September 22, the team placed him on injured reserve due to lingering symptoms after sustaining a concussion in the Week 1 game against the Miami Dolphins.

Spaight recorded his first career interception against quarterback Brett Hundley in the Week 11 victory over the Green Bay Packers in 2016.

On September 1, 2018, Spaight was released by the Redskins.

Miami Dolphins
Spaight signed with the Miami Dolphins on September 25, 2018. He was released on November 9, 2018.

Jacksonville Jaguars
On November 13, 2018, Spaight was signed by the Jacksonville Jaguars. He was released on December 28, 2018.

Kansas City Chiefs
On January 4, 2019, Spaight signed a reserve/future contract with the Kansas City Chiefs. 

Spaight announced his retirement from the NFL on May 20, 2019.

Massachusetts Pirates
Spaight signed with the Massachusetts Pirates of the Indoor Football League for the 2021 season.  Spaight was named to the 2021 All-IFL second-team during the season where he recorded 71 tackles, 3.5 sacks and 5 pass breakups. On March 10, 2022, Spaight was released by the Pirates.

Vegas Vipers
Spaight signed with the Vegas Vipers of the XFL on February 13, 2023.

References

External links
Jacksonville Jaguars bio
Arkansas Razorbacks bio
Miami Dolphins bio

1993 births
Living people
American football linebackers
Arkansas Razorbacks football players
Coffeyville Red Ravens football players
Jacksonville Jaguars players
Kansas City Chiefs players
Miami Dolphins players
People from North Little Rock, Arkansas
Players of American football from Arkansas
Vegas Vipers players
Washington Redskins players